Merc or MERC may refer to:

Merc
 Merc (MUD), a text-based online game software platform
 Merc (role-playing game), 1981
 Merc (script) or Meroitic Cursive, derived from Demotic Egyptian
 Merc 2000, an alternative setting for the Twilight 2000 role-playing game
 Merc Clothing, classic British clothing brand
 Mark Hazzard: Merc, a comic book series published by Marvel Comics

Merc. as an abbreviation
 Mercury (automobile), a former division of Ford Motor Company
 Chicago Mercantile Exchange, or the building where it operates, the Chicago Mercantile Exchange Center
 Mercantile National Bank Building, a building in Downtown Dallas
 Mercury Marine, and their line of outboard motors
 Mercedes-Benz, a motor manufacturer and its products (primarily U.K. slang)
 A slang term for a mercenary
 The Mercury News, a newspaper
 Mercian Regiment, an infantry regiment of the British Army

Acronyms
 Mobile emission reduction credit, used in pollution reduction
 Middle East Rally Championship
 Sir Peter Blake Marine Education and Recreation Centre, an outdoor leisure complex in New Zealand
 Maharashtra Electricity Regulatory Commission, an electricity regulatory commission in Maharashtra, India
 Media Education Research Centre, Kashmir University
 Mineral Exploration Research Centre, a geological research centre at Laurentian University

See also
 Mercs, a 1990 arcade game
 Merck (disambiguation)
 Merk (disambiguation)
 Murk (disambiguation)
 Mercury (disambiguation)